The Changeling is a 2017 fantasy/horror novel by Victor LaValle.

Synopsis
Apollo Kagwa is just beginning to settle into his new life as a committed and involved father, unlike his own father who abandoned him, when his wife Emma begins acting strange. Disconnected and uninterested in their new baby boy, Emma at first seems to be exhibiting signs of post-partum depression, but it becomes clear that her troubles go beyond that. Before Apollo can do anything to help, Emma commits a horrific act—beyond any parent's comprehension—and vanishes, seemingly into thin air. Thus begins Apollo's journey through an enchanted world to find his wife.

Reception
In a review of The Changeling in Locus magazine, American author John Langan wrote that there is "a deep humanity" in The Changeling that remains with you long after finishing it. He said several authors, including Ramsey Campbell, Stephen King and Peter Straub have explored how people respond to horror, and LaValle makes "a significant contribution to this tradition" in The Changeling. Langan said this is a fairy tale, but not the traditional "sanitized [and] moralistic" tale: it "flips the script of so many narratives of the fantastic" and draws instead on Scandinavian folklore.

American film critic Terrence Rafferty said The Changeling is a "strange and wonderful new novel". Writing in The New York Times, he called the book a "rambunctious fairy-tale epic", but of the "old kind" where there are no "happily ever after" endings. Rafferty said LaValle periodically shatters the readers' "happily-ever-after reverie" with horrors and catastrophes, and the truth "about the anxieties and ambivalences of modern parenting, the psychological value of the stories we tell ourselves and our children, and the rigors of survival in urban America." Rafferty stated that many of the characters in The Changeling are descendants of immigrants, and the novel is "rich in the ambiguous history of [New York City] ... [and] its noisy, clamorous setting."

In a review in The Guardian, James Smart called The Changeling a "punchy cocktail of modern parenting and ancient magic". He liked the role technology plays in the novel, and described New York City as "arguably the book’s strongest character". Smart felt he would have liked the villains to have had "a little more oomph", but added, "LaValle hooks the reader deep into his increasingly eldritch thriller."

Kirkus Reviews described The Changeling as a "smart and knotty merger of horror, fantasy, and realism", and added that "this blend of horror story and fatherhood fable is surprising and admirably controlled". The review said that while the plot can be "labyrinthine", the pieces all connect in the end. It concluded, "LaValle has successfully delivered a tale of wonder and thoughtful exploration of what it means to be a parent."

Awards

The Changeling was one of 15 winners of the 2018 American Book Award, seventh in Time magazine's "Top 10 Novels of 2017", and among The New York Times Book Review's "100 Notable Books of 2017."

Adaptations

In 2018, FX announced that they were planning a TV adaptation of The Changeling. The series would be a co-production with Annapurna Television with Kelly Marcel attached to pen the script. In 2021, Apple TV+ announced a series order for the show, with Lakeith Stanfield to star and executive produce.

References

External links

The Changeling at FantasticFiction

2017 American novels
American fantasy novels
World Fantasy Award for Best Novel-winning works
Spiegel & Grau books